Glashaus is the debut studio album by German band Glashaus. It was released on 2 April 2001 via Pelham Power Productions (3p) and Intergroove Records. Produced by band members Moses Pelham, and Martin Haas, the album peaked at number 20 on the German Albums Chart and spawned the top five hit "Wenn das Liebe ist", which was certified gold by the Bundesverband Musikindustrie (BVMI).

Track listing

Charts

Weekly charts

Year-end charts

References

2001 albums
Glashaus albums